Holla: The Best of Trin-i-tee 5:7 compiles the greatest hits of the gospel group Trin-i-tee 5:7. The album charted at #17 on Top Gospel charts, #45 on the Top Christian, and #70 on the Top R&B charts. It was released five years after their third studio album, and three months prior to the group's fourth studio album.

Track listing
Put Your Hands
God's Grace
Holla (Urban Remix)
With A Kiss
There He Is (featuring Kirk Franklin)
People Get Ready
Dance Like Sunday
My Body
I Promise You (featuring Crystal Lewis)
Highway (featuring Tramaine Hawkins)
God's Blessing
Mary Don't You Weep

References

Trin-i-tee 5:7 albums
2007 greatest hits albums